César Castellanos may refer to:
César Castellanos (pastor), Colombian pastor
César Castellanos (politician) (1948–1998), Honduras politician

See also
Castellanos (surname)